League of Yugoslav Communist Youth may refer to:

 Young Communist League of Yugoslavia (1948-1990)
 Youth wing of the New Communist Party of Yugoslavia (1992-)